Trigrad Gap (Trigradska Sedlovina \tri-'grad-ska se-dlo-vi-'na\) is a saddle of 500 m height in the Delchev Ridge in the Tangra Mountains of eastern Livingston Island  in the South Shetland Islands, Antarctica.  The gap is bounded to the southwest by Spartacus Peak and to the northeast by Yavorov Peak. The feature is named after the Bulgarian village of Trigrad.

Location

Maps
 L.L. Ivanov et al. Antarctica: Livingston Island and Greenwich Island, South Shetland Islands. Scale 1:100000 topographic map. Sofia: Antarctic Place-names Commission of Bulgaria, 2005.
 L.L. Ivanov. Antarctica: Livingston Island and Greenwich, Robert, Snow and Smith Islands. Scale 1:120000 topographic map. Troyan: Manfred Wörner Foundation, 2010.  (First edition 2009. )
 Antarctic Digital Database (ADD). Scale 1:250000 topographic map of Antarctica. Scientific Committee on Antarctic Research (SCAR). Since 1993, regularly updated.
 L.L. Ivanov. Antarctica: Livingston Island and Smith Island. Scale 1:100000 topographic map. Manfred Wörner Foundation, 2017.

References
 Trigrad Gap. SCAR Composite Antarctic Gazetteer
 Bulgarian Antarctic Gazetteer. Antarctic Place-names Commission. (details in Bulgarian, basic data in English)

External links
 Trigrad Gap. Copernix satellite image

Tangra Mountains